The  men's stationary target small-bore rifle, also referred to as the miniature rifle competition, was one of 15 events on the Shooting at the 1908 Summer Olympics programme.  Regulation of the equipment used in the event was done through proscribing ammunition weighing more than 140 grains, with a velocity of more than 1,450 feet per second, or having a hard metal base. Magnifying and telescopic sights were prohibited. Each shooter fired 80 shots, half at 50 yards and half at 100 yards.  Maximum score for a shot was 5 points, giving a maximum total possible of 400 points.

Twelve competitors from each nation were allowed to take part.  Because of a delay in the arrival of Barnes' registration, the British team registered Philip Plater as a replacement.  The original registration later arrived, resulting in Britain having 13 entrants.  Further confusion on the day of competition resulted in all 13 shooting, Plater going last.  Plater, who had scored 391 points to place first in the event and set a world record, was ruled to have been the illegal competitor and his score was invalidated.

Results

References

Sources
 
 

Men's rifle small-bore individual stationary